Gelagna succincta, common name the lesser girdled triton, is a species of predatory sea snail, a marine gastropod mollusk in the family Cymatiidae.

Distribution
This species is distributed in the Indian Ocean (Tanzania, Madagascar), in the Atlantic Ocean (Gabon, West Africa, Cape Verde) and the Red Sea. Also reported from Brazil and from South-East Florida. Beached shells are rarely known from the East coast of Barbados, Lesser Antilles.

Description 
The shell size varies between 30 mm and 80 mm.

The maximum recorded shell length is 45 mm.

Habitat 
The minimum recorded depth for this species is 20 m; maximum recorded depth is 20 m.

References

Further reading 
 Spry, J.F. (1961). The sea shells of Dar es Salaam: Gastropods. Tanganyika Notes and Records 56
 Bernard, P.A. (Ed.) (1984). Coquillages du Gabon [Shells of Gabon]. Pierre A. Bernard: Libreville, Gabon. 140, 75 plates
 Rolán E., 2005. Malacological Fauna From The Cape Verde Archipelago. Part 1, Polyplacophora and Gastropoda

External links
 Gastropods.com ; Cymatium (Gelagna) succinctum; accessed : 7 November 2010

Cymatiidae
Taxa named by Carl Linnaeus
Molluscs described in 1771
Molluscs of the Atlantic Ocean
Molluscs of the Indian Ocean
Invertebrates of Gabon
Invertebrates of Tanzania
Fauna of the Red Sea